HMS Valentine has been the name of more than one ship of the British Royal Navy, and may refer to:

 , a barge built in 1418 and sold in 1424
 , a destroyer leader launched in 1917 and sunk in 1940
 HMS Valentine (R03), renamed , a destroyer launched in 1943 and transferred to Yugoslavia in 1956
 HMS Valentine (R17), originally named HMS Kempenfelt (R17), a destroyer launched in 1943 and transferred to Canada in 1944 for service as 

Royal Navy ship names